The 2021 Karlsruhe Open (also known as the Liqui Moly Open for sponsorship reasons) was a professional tennis tournament played on outdoor clay courts. It was the 2nd edition of the tournament and part of the 2021 WTA 125K series, offering a total of $125,000 in prize money. It took place in Karlsruhe, Germany between 7 and 12 September 2021. The tournament did not take place in 2020 due to the COVID-19 pandemic. The singles part of the tournament had 32 competitors. Patricia Maria Țig was the defending champion, having won the previous edition in 2019, but chose not to participate. Mayar Sherif won the title, defeating Martina Trevisan in the final, 6–3, 6–2.

Seeds

Draw

Finals

Top half

Bottom half

Qualifying

Seeds

Qualifiers

Qualifying draw

First qualifier

Second qualifier

Third qualifier

Fourth qualifier

References

External Links
Main Draw
Qualifying Draw

Karlsruhe Open - Singles